RCAF Station Caron was a Second World War British Commonwealth Air Training Plan (BCATP) station located near Caron, Saskatchewan, Canada. It was operated and administered by the Royal Canadian Air Force (RCAF).

History

World War II
The Station hosted No. 33 Elementary Flying Training Schools (EFTS). The school was opened by the Royal Air Force on 5 January 1942.  The Aero Club of BC took over operation of the School 25 May 1942 and the school was closed 14 January 1944.

Aerodrome Information 
The aerodrome was listed with three runways as follows:

A review of Google Maps on 10 June 2018 shows that none of the former aerodrome remains.  It appears that the old taxiway and 13/31 runway are now occupied by housing and the remaining runways have been completely reclaimed for agriculture. The coordinates from the c.1942 publication appear to be slightly north of the actual location of the former airfield a more likely coordinate would be  based on the drawings in the reference.

Relief landing field – Boharm
The Relief field was laid out in the standard triangular pattern on a turf all way field. 
Three runways were listed as follows

A review of Google Maps on 10 June 2018 shows a body of water at the location indicated, no trace of an airfield exists at this location, although the body of water is not possibly large enough to cover the whole airfield if it was at this exact location.

Present
The aerodrome is now the village of Caronport.

References

External links
 Bruce Forsyth's Canadian Military History Page

Military history of Saskatchewan
Royal Canadian Air Force stations
Military airbases in Saskatchewan
Airports of the British Commonwealth Air Training Plan
Defunct airports in Saskatchewan